The 2016–17 Duquesne Dukes women's basketball team will represented Duquesne University during the 2016–17 NCAA Division I women's basketball season. The Dukes, led by fourth year head coach Dan Burt, played their home games at the Palumbo Center as members of the Atlantic 10 Conference. They finished the season 18–16, 8–8 in A-10 play to finish in a tie for seventh place. They advanced to the championship game of the A-10 women's tournament where they lost to Dayton. They were invited to the Women's National Invitation Tournament where they lost to Drexel in the first round.

2016–17 media

Duquesne Dukes Sports Network
Alex Panormios and Tad Maurey provide the call for home games on A-10 Digital Network. Select games will be televised.

Roster

Schedule

|-
!colspan=9 style="background:#00214D; color:#CC0000;"| Regular season

|-
!colspan=9 style="background:#00214D; color:#CC0000;"| Atlantic 10 Tournament

|-
!colspan=9 style="background:#00214D; color:#CC0000;"| WNIT

Rankings
2016–17 NCAA Division I women's basketball rankings

See also
 2016–17 Duquesne Dukes men's basketball team

References

Duquesne
Duquesne Dukes women's basketball seasons
Duquesne
Duquesne
2017 Women's National Invitation Tournament participants